This is a list of Major League Baseball (MLB) franchise postseason and World Series streaks.  The list includes only the modern World Series between the American League (AL) and the National League (NL), not the various 19th-century championship series.

The most successful postseason team in MLB history is the New York Yankees, who have achieved three of the four instances of a franchise winning more than two World Series championships in a row (one streak each of durations 3, 4, and 5 seasons) and five of the six instances of a franchise winning the league pennant (i.e., an appearance in the World Series) more than three times in a row (three streaks of 4 seasons and two streaks of 5 seasons).  The only other franchises to achieve these milestones are the Oakland Athletics, who won three consecutive championships from 1972 to 1974, and the New York Giants, who won four consecutive pennants from 1921 to 1924.  The Yankees also achieved a remarkable run of appearing in 15 of the 18 World Series from 1947 to 1964.

Beginning in 1969, MLB split into four divisions, and the winners of each competed in the League Championship Series, with the winners advancing to the World Series.  When a multi-tier playoff system was implemented in 1995, the LCS remained the series that determined the pennant-winner.  The longest streak of consecutive LCS appearances belongs to the Atlanta Braves with 8 in a row from 1991 to 1999 (not counting 1994, when there were no playoffs), while the second-longest belongs to the Houston Astros who have the longest active streak with 6 in a row from 2017 to 2022.

Further expansion of the postseason began in 1995, with eight teams entering the playoffs each year (further expanded to ten teams in 2012).  In this era, the Braves entered the postseason 14 consecutive years from 1991 to 2005 (again not counting 1994), while the Yankees had a streak of 13 appearances from 1995 to 2007.  However, all other postseason appearance streaks of 6 years or more predate the expanded-postseason era and are mentioned above, except for an ongoing 10-year run by the Los Angeles Dodgers (2013–2022).

World Series championship streaks
The Yankees have achieved one streak each of 3, 4, and 5 championships in a row, and the Athletics have achieved a streak of 3 in a row.  Back-to-back championships have been achieved an additional fourteen times. 

Near streaks: Runs during which a franchise won World Series championships at least 70% of the time, with gaps of no more than one year:

World Series appearance (pennant) streaks
The Yankees have achieved five separate streaks of 4 or 5 pennants in a row, and the Giants achieved one streak of 4 in a row.  Three pennants in a row have been achieved an additional twelve times, and back-to-back pennants an additional twenty-one times.

The Yankees also achieved a remarkable run in which they appeared in 15 of the 18 World Series from 1947 to 1964.

Bold indicates a current streak.

Near streaks: Runs during which a franchise won its league pennant at least 70% of the time, with gaps of no more than one year:

* Because the 1994 playoffs were cancelled, the year 1994 is not counted as either a part or an interruption of any streak.

League Championship Series appearance streaks
The Braves appeared in every LCS held from 1991 to 1999, which is 8 in a row, winning five league pennants and one World Series championship during that time. The American League record is held by the Houston Astros, who have appeared in the ALCS in six straight seasons from 2017 to 2022 that has resulted in four pennants and two world titles. They are the only team to appear in an LCS in six straight completed seasons, as the 90s Braves did not compete in the 1994 NLCS due to the season not being completed. Incidentally, the LCS was the only round preceding the World Series until 1995, when the Division Series was created; the Wild Card Series has acted as the first round for most of the playoff teams on a regular basis since 2022.

The Oakland Athletics in their "Swingin' A's" era previously held the AL record with five appearances in a row, which saw them win three world titles. The Yankees and Cardinals have each achieved an LCS appearance streak of four in a row.  Three LCS appearances in a row have been achieved an additional thirteen times, and back-to-back LCS appearances an additional twenty-two times.

Three teams (the Orioles, Pirates, and Yankees) achieved multiple LCS appearance streaks in and around the 1970s, each adding up to five appearances in six years.

The LCS began in 1969. Before that, the two regular season champions were awarded the pennants and went directly to the World Series.

Bold indicates a current streak.

Near streaks: Runs during which a franchise appeared in its league championship series at least 70% of the time, with gaps of no more than one year:

* Because the 1994 playoffs were cancelled, the year 1994 is not counted as either a part or an interruption of any streak.

Postseason appearance streaks
The Braves and the Yankees have achieved respective streaks of 14 and 13 consecutive appearances in the postseason, centered on the 1990s and 2000s. The Dodgers have an ongoing streak of 10 consecutive appearances. Five postseason appearances in a row have been achieved an additional six times, four in a row an additional seven times, three in a row an additional twenty-eight times, and back-to-back postseason appearances an additional fifty times.

The Yankees appeared in 17 of the 18 postseasons from 1995 to 2012, and 15 of the 18 postseasons from 1947 to 1964 (see pennant near-streaks above).  Five teams (the Indians, Cardinals twice, Red Sox, and Angels) achieved multiple postseason appearance streaks in and around the 1990s and 2000s, each adding up to 6 appearances in 7 or 8 years.  The Phillies appeared in 6 of the 8 postseasons from 1976 to 1983.

Postseason appearance streaks have become more common in recent years, as the postseason has been progressively restructured to include more teams (originally two, four since 1969, eight since 1995, ten since 2012, sixteen in 2020, ten in 2021, twelve since 2022). The Astros, who have reached the postseason six straight times from 2017 to 2022, are the only team to ever win a postseason series in six straight seasons.

Bold indicates a current streak.

Near streaks: Runs during which a franchise appeared in the postseason at least 70% of the time, with gaps of no more than one year:

* Because the 1994 playoffs were cancelled, the year 1994 is not counted as either a part or an interruption of any streak.

References
World Series and MLB Playoffs (Baseball Reference)

See also
List of Major League Baseball franchise postseason droughts
List of Major League Baseball postseason series
List of Major League Baseball postseason teams
List of NFL franchise post-season streaks
List of NBA franchise post-season streaks
List of NHL franchise post-season appearance streaks

Major League Baseball postseason
Major League Baseball records
MLB, Postseason Streaks